Osmium compounds are compounds containing the element osmium (Os). Osmium forms compounds with oxidation states ranging from −2 to +8. The most common oxidation states are +2, +3, +4, and +8. The +8 oxidation state is notable for being the highest attained by any chemical element aside from iridium's +9 and is encountered only in xenon, ruthenium, hassium, iridium, and plutonium.

Oxides 

Osmium tetroxide is the most notable compound of osmium, having many uses. The name "osmium" even derives from Greek "" because of the smell of osmium tetroxide. It also has a number of unusual properties, one being that the solid is volatile.  The compound is colourless, but most samples appear yellow. This is most likely due to the presence of the impurity OsO2, which is yellow-brown in colour. In biology, its property of binding to lipids has made it a widely-used stain in electron microscopy. OsO4 is formed slowly when osmium powder reacts with O2 at ambient temperature. Reaction of bulk solid requires heating to 400 °C.

Os + 2O2 ->[\Delta T] OsO4

OsO4 is a Lewis acid and a mild oxidant. It reacts with alkaline aqueous solution to give the perosmate anion . This species is easily reduced to osmate anion, . When the Lewis base is an amine, adducts are also formed.  Thus OsO4 can be stored in the form of osmeth, in which OsO4 is complexed with hexamine. Osmeth can be dissolved in tetrahydrofuran (THF) and diluted in an aqueous buffer solution to make a dilute (0.25%) working solution of OsO4. With tert-BuNH2, the imido derivative is produced:
OsO4  +  Me3CNH2   →  OsO3(NCMe3) + H2O
Similarly, with NH3 one obtains the nitrido complex:
OsO4 + NH3 + KOH → K[Os(N)O3] + 2 H2O
The [Os(N)O3]− anion is isoelectronic and isostructural with OsO4. OsO4 is very soluble in tert-butyl alcohol. In solution, it is readily reduced by hydrogen to osmium metal. The suspended osmium metal can be used to catalyze hydrogenation of a wide variety of organic chemicals containing double or triple bonds.
OsO4 + 4 H2 → Os  + 4 H2O

OsO4 undergoes "reductive carbonylation" with carbon monoxide in methanol at 400 K and 200 sbar to produce the triangular cluster Os3(CO)12:

3 OsO4  +  24 CO   →   Os3(CO)12  +  12 CO2

Osmium dioxide is another known oxide of osmium, which can be obtained by the reaction of osmium with a variety of oxidizing agents, including, sodium chlorate, osmium tetroxide, and nitric oxide at about 600 °C. It does not dissolve in water, but is attacked by dilute hydrochloric acid. The crystals have rutile structure. Unlike osmium tetroxide, OsO2 is not toxic.

Halides

Fluorides 

Osmium hexafluoride is one of the 17 known binary hexafluorides, which can be made by the direct reaction of osmium metal exposed to an excess of elemental fluorine gas at 300 °C. It is a yellow crystalline solid that melts at 33.4 °C and boils at 47.5 °C. The solid structure measured at −140 °C is orthorhombic space group Pnma. Lattice parameters are a = 9.387 Å, b = 8.543 Å, and c = 4.944 Å. There are four formula units (in this case, discrete molecules) per unit cell, giving a density of 5.09 g·cm−3. The OsF6 molecule itself (the form important for the liquid or gas phase) has octahedral molecular geometry, which has point group (Oh).  The Os–F bond length is 1.827 Å. Partial hydrolysis of OsF6 produces OsOF4. Osmium pentafluoride is a tetramer in the solid state that can be prepared by reduction of osmium hexafluoride with iodine as a solution in iodine pentafluoride:
10 OsF6 +  I2  →   10 OsF5 +  2 IF5

Chlorides 

Osmium tetrachloride exists in two crystalline forms, and is used to prepare other osmium complexes. It was first reported in 1909 as the product of chlorination of osmium metal.
This route affords the high temperature polymorph:
Os  +  2 Cl2  →  OsCl4
This reddish-black polymorph is orthorhombic and adopts a structure in which osmium centres are octahedrally coordinated, sharing opposite edges of the OsCl6 octahedra to form a chain. A brown, apparently cubic polymorph forms upon reduction of osmium tetroxide with thionyl chloride:
OsO4 + 4 SOCl2 → OsCl4 + 2 Cl2  +  4 SO2

Osmium tetroxide dissolves in hydrochloric acid to give the hexachloroosmate anion:
OsO4 + 10 HCl → H2OsCl6 + 2 Cl2  +  4 H2O

Bromides 

Osmium tetrabromide is a black solid that can be produced by heating osmium tetrachloride and bromine under pressure. As determined by X-ray crystallography, osmium tetrabromide is an inorganic polymer. It is isomorphous with platinum tetrabromide and technetium tetrachloride.  As such, osmium is in octahedral coordination. Each osmium center bonds to four doubly bridging bromide ligands and two mutually cis terminal bromide ligands. Osmium tribromide, OsBr3, is the only other binary osmium bromide is that has been crystallized.

Iodides 

Osmium(I) iodide is a metallic grey solid produced by the reaction of osmium tetroxide and hydroiodic acid heated in a water bath for 48 hours in a carbon dioxide atmosphere. It is an amorphous compound. Osmium(II) iodide is a black solid produced by the reaction of osmium tetroxide and hydroiodic acid at 250 °C in nitrogen:
OsO4 + HI → OsI2 + H2O
This compound decomposes in contact with water.Osmium(III) iodide is a black solid that is produced by heating hexaiodoosmic acid (H2OsI6). This compound is insoluble in water. Osmium(IV) iodide has been claimed to exist, although the supposed way to prepare it (reacting osmic acid, H4OsO6, with hydroiodic acid) produced dihydroxonium hexaiodoosmate instead of the tetraiodo compound, and instead contained mono, di and tri-iodo osmium compounds.

Borides 

Osmium borides are notable for their potentially high hardness. It is thought that a combination of high electron density of osmium with the strength of boron-osmium covalent bonds will make osmium borides superhard materials, however this has not been demonstrated yet. For example, OsB2 is hard (hardness comparable to that of sapphire), but not superhard. These borides are produced in vacuum or inert atmosphere to prevent formation
of osmium tetroxide, which is a hazardous compound. Synthesis occurs at high temperatures (~1000 °C) from a mixture of MgB2 and OsCl3. Three osmium borides are known: OsB, Os2B3 and OsB2. The first two have hexagonal structure, similar to that of rhenium diboride. Osmium diboride was first also sought as hexagonal, but one of its phases was later reassigned to orthorhombic. In recent methods of synthesis, it has also been found that a hexagonal phase of OsB2  exists with a similar structure to ReB2.

See also 

 Iron compounds
 Ruthenium compounds
 Rhenium compounds
 Iridium compounds

References 

Compounds
 
Chemical compounds by element